Rackwitz is a municipality in the district of Nordsachsen, in Saxony, Germany.

Geography

Site, situation and location 
Rackwitz is about 10 km north of Leipzig and 13 km south of Delitzsch.

The surrounding landscape belongs to the Leipzig Bay and is drained by the river Lober, a tributary of the Mulde. The lakes Schladitzer See and Werbeliner See, which were created from disused open-cast mines, are situated nearby.

Leipzig Trade Fair Center and Leipzig/Halle Airport are also in the vicinity.

Villages 
Rackwitz municipality contains the following villages with populations in brackets:

Also within the municipality's area are the footprints of the now demolished villages Schladitz with Kömmlitz, Kattersnaundorf and Werbelin, on the sites of which are now lakes, formerly open-cast lignite mines.

History 
The Rackwitz area was settled by Slavs in prehistoric times. The name Rak means shrimp, and can be seen in the coat of arms. Der Ort Rackwitz ist aus den Orten Rackwitz und Güntheritz entstanden. The oldest part of the present day municipality is Podelwitz, which was documented in 1250. Since 1349/50 Zschortau and Rackwitz were mentioned in documents. Brodenaundorf was mentioned in 1547.

At the start of the 15th Century, plague and famine decimated Rackwitz. The municipality was also plundered during the Thirty Years War. In 1692 trials for witchcraft took place in Rackwitz in which two witches were tried.

On June 21, 1871 a train crash killed 19 and injured 56 in the vicinity of Rackwitz.

Mergers and Annexations

Historical Population 

Note that the population figures in the table below include the figures for other districts that were merged with Rackwitz at various points in time (see table above, thereby accounting for significant increases.

Culture and Sights

Buildings 
 The church in Podelwitz was gifted from Henry the Illustrious of the House of Wettin to the Teutonic Order on Christmas Eve 1250. 
 The church in Zschortau contains the last remaining organ by Johann Scheibel, which was tested by Johann Sebastian Bach.
 Only the tower remains from the church in Kreuma.
 Castle in Zschortauer Park which is today an educational institution.
 Herrenhaus of the Rittergutes Güntheritz

References 

Nordsachsen